The Nik-O-Lok Company is a company founded in 1910 with headquarters in Indianapolis, Indiana, that manufactures and leases door locks for pay toilets, along with other types of equipment for public bathrooms. Locks are designed that can be operated by manufacturer-supplied tokens or by quarters.

External links 
 

Lock manufacturers
Manufacturing companies based in Indianapolis
Manufacturing companies established in 1910
American companies established in 1910